Kannadi Higher Secondary School is situated in the Kannadi panchayath in the Palakkad district. It was established in 1998. The school offers courses for higher secondary studies, for 11th and 12th grade, students who  passed their tenth grade. High school sections includes more personality development activities along with the curriculum based  objectives.

Courses offered 
The school offers three streams - Science, Commerce and Humanities, in which Science stream  has an option to choose between Biology and Computer Science.

Admission 
The admission to school is carried out through merit and management quota for all streams. The admission through merit quota is carried out through Centralised Admission Process (CAP) of Kerala Government, namely "Ekajaalakam". As per norms of the Educational Department of Kerala, the school offers reservation for  Scheduled Castes and Scheduled Tribes category students in merit quota executed through Ekajaalakam. There are also other reservation claims available under the norms of educational department of Kerala. The school management can also allot admission to certain number of students in each stream, under management quota, apart from merit quota.

References

Schools in Palakkad
High schools and secondary schools in Kerala